Coleophora serpylletorum is a moth of the family Coleophoridae found in Europe. It was first described by Erich Martin Hering in 1889.

Description
The wingspan is about 9 mm.

The larvae feed on species of thyme such as Thymus praecox, Thymus odoratissimus and Thymus serpyllum. They create an untidy composite leaf case of about 9 mm with a mouth angle of 90°. The larva completely mines out a leaf, usually at the top of a twig, often while attached to the leaf margin. When the leaf is emptied it is cut off and is added to the case. Full-grown larvae can be found in June.

Distribution
It is found from Denmark and Latvia to Spain, Sardinia, Italy and Greece and from Great Britain to Romania. It is also present in northern Russia.

References

External links

serpylletorum
Leaf miners
Moths described in 1889
Moths of Europe
Taxa named by Erich Martin Hering